DramaQueen is a Houston-based English-language publisher of domestic, Japanese, Korean, and Taiwanese comics founded in 2005. DramaQueen also publishes an original English-language yaoi anthology called Rush, which made its debut in 2006. RUSH ceased publishing when the company experienced financial issues and were uncommunicative with the creators involved in the project. In March 2010, after a four-year hiatus from publishing, during which time the company lost some of its Japanese licenses, Dramaqueen released the BL manhwa The Summit by Lee Young-hee.
On their forums, CEO Tran Nguyen indicated RUSH would return in a new format in 2011.

Titles

Brother by Yuzuha Ougi
Lies & Kisses by Masara Minase
Not Love by Kano Miyamoto
Invoke by Kiriko Higashizato
Omen by Makoto Tateno
Empty Heart by Masara Minase
Missing Road by Shushushu Sakurai
Cage of Thorns by Sonoko Sakuragawa
Angel or Devil? by Jun Uzuki
Challengers by Hinako Takanaga
The Judged by Akira Honma
Scent of Temptation by Mako Toyama (release June 2008)
White Guardian by Duo Brand.
Crimson Wind by Duo Brand.
Last Portrait by Akira Honma
Sweetheart by Seika Kisaragi
Instinctively a Man by Takashi Kanzaki (release June 2008)
Awakening Desires by Bohra Naono (release April 2008)
Allure by Yuri Ebihara
Temptation by Momiji Maeda (release April 2008)
Here comes the Wolf?!! by Yōichirō Kōga (release June 2008)
10K¥ Lover by Dr. Ten
Audition by Kye Young Chon
DVD by Kye Young Chon
Devil x Devil by Sachiyo Sawauchi
8mm by You Na
Peter Panda by Na Yae-ri
Promise by Lee Eun-young
Mandayuu and Me by Shushushu Sakurai
Lovely Sick by Shoko Ohmine
Naked Jewels Corporation by Shushushu Sakurai
Virtuoso di Amore by Uki Ogasawara
Your Honest Deceit by Sakufu Ajimine
The Summit by Lee Young-hee

References

External links
Official Website
 Lees, Sharon. "DramaQueen: Yaoi Publishers Interviews Part 2". Akiba Angels. July 2006.
 

Comic book publishing companies of the United States
Manhwa distributors